The Desert Studies Center (DSC) is a field station of the California State University located in Zzyzx, California, United States in the Mojave Desert.  The purpose of the Center is to provide opportunities to conduct research, receive instruction and experience the Mojave Desert environment.  It is officially operated by the California Desert Studies Consortium, a consortium of 7 CSU campuses: Dominguez Hills, Fullerton, Long Beach, Los Angeles, Northridge, San Bernardino and Cal Poly Pomona.

Before the Center, the site was the Zzyzx Mineral Springs and Health Spa, run by Curtis Howe Springer from 1944 to 1974 without federal permission.  After Springer was ejected, the CSU negotiated usage of the abandoned buildings of the health spa with the Bureau of Land Management, and in 1976, they signed a five-year cooperative management study for the Desert Studies Consortium to manage  at Soda Springs. The California Desert Protection Act of 1994 established Mojave National Preserve, and established the Desert Studies Center as a partnership between the National Park Service and the California State University in perpetuity.

The location is especially interesting to biologists because of its perennial wetlands that attract many species of animals and plants in the area, including the threatened and endangered Saratoga Springs pupfish, the Mohave tui chub, and over 200 species of birds.

A few of California State University Fullerton's biology courses require students visit the center for a mandatory field trip to pass those courses.

See also
 Lake Tuendae

References

External links

 
 "The Metamorphosis of Zzyzx" from the Cal State Fullerton Titan Magazine site, with history and other information about the Center

 

California State University
Mojave Desert
Research at Cal Poly Pomona
Buildings and structures in San Bernardino County, California
1975 establishments in California